Vasile Gain (born 5 January 1912) was a Romanian football midfielder and a manager.

International career
Gain played two games at international level for Romania.

Honours

Player
Venus București
Divizia A: 1938–39
Universitatea Cluj
Cupa României runner-up: 1933–34

Manager
BNR București
Divizia C: 1946–47
CFR Timișoara
Divizia C: 1965–66

References

External links

Vasile Gain manager profile at Labtof.ro

1912 births
Romanian footballers
Romania international footballers
Association football defenders
Liga I players
FC Politehnica Timișoara players
Banatul Timișoara players
FC Universitatea Cluj players
Venus București players
Olympia București players
FC Progresul București players
Romanian football managers
FC Politehnica Timișoara managers
FC Progresul București managers 
FC Sportul Studențesc București managers
FC Universitatea Cluj managers
People from Timiș County
Year of death missing